Sam Rouanet (born 15 November 1972 in Toulouse, France) is a French-born guitarist, DJ and producer of electronic music who lives and works in Berlin, Germany.

Career
Sam Rouanet studied violin and classical music in Toulouse, France. He moved to Chicago in the late 1990s and began to play guitar in bands within the post-rock scene there. After returning to Europe, Sam started producing electronic music, mostly under the alias Reynold. First he moved to London playing bass with the electronic duo Kinobe, before moving to Paris where he co-founded the Minimal Dancin' event where artists such as Swayzak, Metro Area, T. Raumschmiere, Roman Flügel of the duo Alter Ego, Feadz, Trentemøller, Aril Brikha, Booka Shade among many others. After success in Paris, Sam finally moved to Berlin to explore the electronic scene there.

He has released records for such labels as Persona, Plexi, KINA, Treibstoff and his own label, Trenton Records. Reynold's music has been well reviewed by international publications such as Resident Advisor and De:Bug.

In 2003 Sam co-created the electronic music label Trenton Records, which has since released over 50 records from artists such as John Tejada, Stewart Walker, Jeff Samuel, 3 Channels and Touane among others.

He has been the host of the monthly "Minimal Dancin" events at the Nouveau Casino in Paris, France, between 2001 and 2009 alongside Duplex 100 partner Phil Stumpf.

In 2010, Rouanet worked with Kazakh electronic musicians, in a project sponsored by the French Embassy in Kazakhstan and the Goethe-Institut, in creating a collaborative album entitled "Tronicstan". He later toured with some of the Kazakh participants around France and Germany.

In 2011 Sam Rouanet also released an album CD with his father Jacques Rouanet as a project called "Kigo".
Sam is also collaborating on a number of live band projects with like-minded artists including “Spleen Underground Music”, “brome”  or American electronic music producer Stewart Walker with whom he shares the “Ivory Tower Studio” in Berlin.

Releases

2015  S.U.M. Salt & Pepper, Flumo Recordings  
2014  S.U.M, Ye Ole EP, Trenton Records  
2014  Reynold & Phil Stumpf, On The Move, Souvenir  
2013  S.U.M. Love & Happiness, Dirt Crew Rec  
2013  Spleen Live, Fusionary Part1, Back To The Balearics  
2013  S.U.M, Spleen Underground Music, Trenton Records  
2012  Reynold, The Rain, Trenton  
2012  Reynold, Bring it on, Liquid Garden, part.2, Eintakt  
2012  Giovanni Verga & Reynold, Into the Bone, Sirus Pandi2012  Le Projet Minsk, album/CD, Trenton  
2011  Gelmatica, Craft, Subtraction  
2011  KIGO “Princesse”, Subtraction  
2010  Reynold, Tempura EP, High Jack  
2010  Tronicstan album/CD, Trenton  
2010  Reynold, Un Air de Gondole, KINA  
2010  Reynold, To Know You EP, Trenton  
2009  Reynold, Cococurry EP, Plexi records  
2009  The Seasons, Undone, CD album, City Centre Office  
2008  Reynold, Another Way EP, Persona Express 002  
2008  Reynold, Faze part. 2, Trenton  
2008  Reynold, Faze part.1, Trenton  
2008  Reynold & 3 Channels, Macho Lato, Trenton  
2007  Reynold / Aki Latvamaki: split EP, Curle 08  
2007  Reynold Vs Aspro: god is given, Microfon 10  
2007  Reynold: the leisure hive EP, Fragmented audio 01  
2007  Reynold Vs Aspro: musique basique, Lebensfreude  
2007  Reynold / Denis Karimani: split EP, Curle 05  
2007  Reynold: La cité d’en haut EP, Persona  
2006  Johnny Wagner: intercity EP, Trenton  
2006  Reynold: my favorite movie CD/album,Persona  
2006  Reynold Vs Aspro: U-turn, Microfon 06  
2006  Rerynold: blue print EP, Body talk  
2006  Reynold / Denis Karimani: split EP, Curle 02  
2006  Reynold: montrose place EP, MA citysport  
2006  Duplex 100: flashcam EP, Cray1Labworks  
2006  Reynold: tropical storm EP, Baystreet rec  
2006  Reynold: planet vinea EP, S'hort records  
2006  Reynold: food for thought EP, Out of orbit  
2006  Reynold Vs Phil Stumpf: for house, Sushitech  
2006  Reynold Vs Aspro: angle & curve, trenton  
2005  Duplex100: this is crime EP, MA  
2005  Duplex100: Well hung EP, 3rd floor  
2005  Reynold: playfool EP, MA citysport  
2005  Duplex 100: Big shot EP, Treibstoff  
2005  Reynold: mathmos, compil. Highgrade  
2005  Duplex 100: 12", Initial Cuts  
2005  Duplex 100: Duplexity EP, Morris/audio  
2005  Reynold: 12", Morris/audio city sport  
2004  Reynold: web EP, electro chelou  
2004  Duplex 100: Extrapoliert EP, Initial cuts  
2004  Duplex 100: Bipolar EP, Treibstoff  
2004  Reynold: Winnemark EP, Morris | Audio  
2004  Duplex 100: 1 track on Regular compil.  
2004  Duplex 100: shooting star EP, Onitor  
2004  Reynold: split EP 12", Trenton 002  
2003  Reynold: a side split EP, 12" Trenton 001  
2003  Reynold: Mystic, "Paris Lounge vol3  
2003   Reynold: Tomy is Dancin' 12", Dumb-Unit  
2003  Babyreynold: Compil "Artificiel", musiques modernes  
2003  Canvas: Naked 12", Nacopa'jaz (rmx by Modernist)  
2003  Canvas: Buona Modulazione LP/CD, Nacopa'jaz  
2003  Duplex100: Rue Rouvet 12", Popular Tools  
2003  Duplex100: popular internationalist #1  
2003  Canvas: Origine J 12", Nacopa'jaz  
2002  Crapule12" Indestructible/La Ink  
2002  Canvas. Duplex 100: O'range, Serial  
1999  12", Inkorporation 01

References

External links
Sam Rouanet's Official Website
Trenton Records' Label Website
Reynold discography at Discogs
Duplex 100 discography at Discogs
Minimal Dancin

1972 births
Living people
French guitarists
French male guitarists
French dance musicians
French electronic musicians
French DJs
Musicians from Toulouse
Electronic dance music DJs
21st-century guitarists
21st-century French male musicians